The Diocese of Biella is a Roman Catholic ecclesiastical territory in northern Italy, in the Piedmont region, created in 1772. It is a suffragan of the Archdiocese of Vercelli. Biella is a city in Piedmont.

History

Until 1772 Biella was under the jurisdiction of the Archdiocese of Vercelli. In that year Pope Clement XI, at the request of Charles Emmanuel III of Sardinia, established the Diocese of Biella by the papal bull Praecipua.

The first bishop was Giulio Cesare Viancini, formerly Archbishop of Sassari in Sardinia. In 1803 Napoleon suppressed the diocese, which again fell under the jurisdiction of Vercelli, but was re-established in 1817 by Pope Pius VII who appointed as bishop the Observant Franciscan, Bernardino Bollati.

In the shrine of Maria Santissima d'Oropa, situated on a mountain near Biella, the diocese preserves a memorial of St. Eusebius of Vercelli, who was banished to the Orient by Emperor Constantius for his defence of Catholicism against Arianism. St. Eusebius, according to tradition, upon his return from the East, is said to have brought three pictures of the Madonna painted on cedar wood, one of which, the image of Oropa, he placed in a small oratory he had built. In the tenth century the chapel was placed in charge of the Benedictines. When they abandoned the place, Pope Pius II, in 1459, made over the shrine to the Chapter of the Collegiate Church of San Stefano, now the Biella Cathedral, to which it has since belonged. In the sixteenth century, the inhabitants of Biella, in thanksgiving for their deliverance from the plague, built a church over the chapel. In the seventeenth century construction of the devotional complex known as the Sacro Monte di Oropa began.

Among the religious edifices of the city of Biella, the most notable is the Gothic cathedral, built in 1402. Its beautiful choir is by Galliari. The baptistery, in the form of a small temple, is said to be an ancient Roman edifice. It is in fact a work of the eleventh century, erected on the site of a Roman tomb.

The Chapter of the Cathedral is far older than the Cathedral itself. The Canons of the Collegiate Church of San Stefano appear already in the twelfth century.  The Chapter was composed of a Provost, a Treasurer and a Primicerius, among a total of twenty canons.  There were also twelve chaplains.

Bishops of Biella

 Giulio Cesare Viancini (1 October 1772  – 22 October 1796 died)
 Giovanni Battista Canaveri, Orat. (26 November 1797  – 1 February 1805)  (promoted Bishop of Vercelli, 1 February 1805)
 Bernardino Bollati, O.F.M.Observ. (21 December 1818  – 11 June 1828 died)
 Placido Maria Tadini (13 August 1829  – 28 October 1833 appointed as apostolic administrator of the Diocese of Genoa and later made cardinal.
 Giovanni Pietro Losana (6 April 1834  – 14 February 1873 died)
 Basilio Leto (10 August 1873  – 19 December 1885 resigned; became Bishop of Samaria)
 Domenico Cumino (15 January 1886  – 29 June 1901 died)
 Giuseppe Gamba (16 December 1901  – 13 August 1906 made Bishop of Novara)
 Giovanni Andrea Masera (19 August 1906  – 2 December 1912 made auxiliary Bishop of Sabina)
 Natale Serafino (2 December 1912  – 22 March 1917 made Bishop of Chiavari)
 Giovanni Garigliano (22 March 1917  – 10 October 1936 died)
 Carlo Rossi (7 December 1936  – 15 February 1972 retired)
 Vittorio Piola (15 February 1972  – 15 May 1986 resigned)
 Massimo Giustetti (3 December 1986  – 13 July 2001 retired
 Gabriele Mana (13 July 2001  – )

Parishes
The diocese, which covers an area of 900 km², is divided into 114 parishes. All but one are in the civil Province of Biella, the other falls within Province of Vercelli. A list of parishes by province and commune follows; locations (villages or neighbourhoods) within a commune are shown in brackets.

Province of Biella
Andorno Micca
S. Giuseppe (San Giuseppe di Casto)
S. Lorenzo
Benna
S. Pietro
Biella
S. Antonio
S. Bernardo
S. Biagio
S. Cassiano
S. Giacomo
S. Maria Assunta e S. Quirico
S. Paolo
S. Stefano
S. Giovanni Battista (Cossila)
S. Grato - (Cossila)
S. Giuseppe - (Favaro)
S. Carlo (Pavignano)
Santi Giovanni e Defendente (Vaglio e Colma)
Nostra Signora di Oropa (Villaggio Lamarmora)
Bioglio
S. Maria Assunta
Borriana
S. Sulpizio
Callabiana
S. Maria degli Angeli
Camandona
Santi Grato e Policarpo
Camburzano
S. Martino
Campiglia Cervo
Santi Bernardo e Giuseppe
Candelo
S. Lorenzo
S. Pietro
Casapinta
S. Lorenzo
Cavaglià
S. Michele
Cerreto Castello
S. Tommaso
Cerrione
S. Giovanni Battista
SS. Annunziata
S. Giorgio (Vergnasco)
Coggiola
S. Giorgio
S. Grato
Cossato
Gesù Nostra Speranza
S. Defendente
S. Maria Assunta
S. Pietro (Castellengo)
Crosa
Santi Cosma e Damiano
Donato
Santi Pietro Paolo e Giovanni Battista
Dorzano
S. Lorenzo
Gaglianico
S. Pietro
Gifflenga
S. Martino
Graglia
S. Fede
Santi Grato e Defendente
Lessona
S. Lorenzo
Magnano
Santi Giovanni Battista e Secondo
Massazza
S. Maria Assunta
Mezzana Mortigliengo
S. Bartolomeo
Miagliano
S. Antonio
Mongrando
S. Lorenzo
S. Maria Assunta
S. Rocco
Mosso
S. Maria Assunta
Mottalciata
Beata Maria Vergine del Carmine
Muzzano
Santi Giuseppe e Bernardo
S. Eusebio
Netro
S. Maria Assunta 
SS. Annunziata
Occhieppo Inferiore
S. Antonino
Occhieppo Superiore
S. Antonio
S. Stefano
Pettinengo
S. Bernardo
Santi Stefano e Giacomo
Piatto
S. Michele
Piedicavallo
Santi Michele e Grato
Pollone
S. Eusebio Prete
Ponderano
S. Lorenzo
Portula
Immacolata Concezione di Maria
S. Maria della Neve
Pralungo
S. Eurosia
S. Maria della Pace
Pray Biellese
S. Antonio
Quaregna
S. Martino
Ronco Biellese
S. Michele
Roppolo
S. Maria del Rosario e S. Michele
Rosazza
Santi Pietro e Giorgio
Sagliano Micca
Santi Giacomo e Stefano
Sala Biellese
S. Martino
Salussola
S. Maria Assunta
Natività di Maria
S. Bartolomeo
San Paolo Cervo
S. Eusebio
Sandigliano
S. Maria Assunta
Selve Marcone
S. Grato
Soprana
S. Giuseppe
Sordevolo
S. Ambrogio
Strona
Natività di Maria
Tavigliano
Santissima Trinità e San Carlo
Ternengo
S. Eusebio
Tollegno
S. Germano
Torrazzo
S. Maria Assunta
Trivero
Santi Quirico e Giulitta
Visitazione di Maria
Santi Fabiano e Sebastiano (Bulliana)
Sacro Cuore di Gesù (Ponzone)
Santissima Trinità (Ponzone)
S. Giuseppe - (Pratrivero)
Valdengo
S. Biagio
Vallanzengo
Santi Orso e Brigida
Valle Mosso
Cuore Immacolata di Maria (Campore)
S. Eusebio
Santi Antonio e Bernardo (Croce Mosso)
Valle San Nicolao
S. Nicolao
Veglio
S. Giovanni Battista
Verrone
S. Lorenzo
Vigliano Biellese
S. Maria Assunta
S. Giuseppe Operaio (Villaggi)
Villanova Biellese
S. Barnaba
Viverone
S. Maria Assunta
Zimone
S. Giorgio
Zubiena
S. Nicolao
Santi Cassiano e Carlo
Zumaglia
Santi Fabiano e Sebastiano

Province of Vercelli
Carisio
S. Lorenzo

References

Sources, and further reading
.

.

 p. 813.
Negro, Flavia (2008). "Scheda storico-territoriale del comune di Biella." [self-published]

 pp. 133–134.

External links
 Diocesi di Biella  Official site.
.  Retrieved: 2016-10-07.
 .

Roman Catholic dioceses in Piedmont
Religious organizations established in 1772
Dioceses established in the 18th century
Biella
Province of Biella
Province of Vercelli